The 47th Annual Australian Film Institute Awards (generally known as AFI Awards), were a series of awards which included the AFI Craft Awards and the AFI Awards Ceremony. Presented by the Australian Film Institute (AFI), the awards celebrated the best in Australian feature film, television, documentary and short film productions of 2005. The two events were held in Melbourne, Victoria, with the former presentation at the Waterfront City Pavilion, and the latter at the Melbourne Central City Studios, on 25 November and 26 November 2005, respectively. The AFI Awards Ceremony was televised on the Nine Network, with actor Russell Crowe hosting both this and the AFI Craft Awards.

Look Both Ways received the most feature film awards with five, including Best Film and Best Direction. Little Fish  and The Proposition collected four awards each. The only other winner was Three Dollars with one for Best Adapted Screenplay. In the television categories, Love My Way won five awards, including Best Drama Series, Best Direction and Best Screenplay. MDA was given two awards. Other television winners were Holly's Heroes, John Safran vs God, The Glass House and The Incredible Journey of Mary Bryant, with one each.

Ceremony
After poor viewership of the 2004 Awards ceremony, the AFI hired live entertainment promoter Paul Dainty to revamp the event. This included splitting the awards into two separate events: The AFI Craft Awards and the AFI Awards Ceremony, which were held on the 25 November and 26 November, respectively. The Craft Awards were presented for technical achievements in feature films, television and non-feature films. The chief executive of the AFI said the reason behind the split was to give "craft nominees more respect, with their own black-tie event." The decision, however, was met with some criticism from industry members, who felt that they were being undermined and overshadowed by the other non-technical categories. Australian Screen Editors said the "split undermines the uniquely collaborative nature of filmmaking and sent the wrong message for the next generation of filmmakers."

Australian actor Russell Crowe was chosen to host the AFI Craft Awards and the AFI Awards Ceremony. Awards at both presentations were handed out on the 25 November and 26 November, respectively. The latter event received a delayed broadcast on Nine Network at 10:55pm, and a five-minute segment dedicated to the Craft Awards was shown. The ceremony drew in an audience of 900,000 viewers. Crowe's work as host, and the AFI's decision to hire Dainty to produce the event was well received by critics. The Age felt Dainty's involvement in the production of the ceremony "was pivotal to the awards' renaissance", adding that splitting the awards "put an end to the drawn-out ceremonies of years past." Michaela Boland from Variety praised Crowe for his "charming [and] funny" performance hosting the show.

Winners and nominees
The nominations were announced by Australian actors Claudia Karvan and Alex Dimitriades on 21 October 2005 at the Wharf Restaurant in Sydney, New South Wales. Leading the feature film nominees was Little Fish with thirteen. Love My Way gained the most television nominations with six.

Feature film

Television

Non-feature film

See also
AACTA Awards

References

External links
The Australian Academy of Cinema and Television Arts Official website
2005 AFI Awards nominations & results

Film
A
A
A